Lake Tondano is the largest lake in North Sulawesi, Indonesia.

The halfbeak fish Tondanichthys kottelati and calanoid copepod Phyllodiaptomus sulawesensis are endemic to the lake.

References

Lakes of Sulawesi